This Is No Time for Romance is a Canadian short drama film, directed by Fernand Dansereau and released in 1967. An exploration of the changing role of women in the early years of feminism, the film stars Monique Mercure as Madeleine, a housewife who is beginning to resent being defined by her relationship to her husband Gervais (Marc Favreau) and their children, and daydreams about possible alternative life paths she could have taken.

The film won the Canadian Film Award for Best Film Under 30 Minutes at the 20th Canadian Film Awards in 1968.

References

External links
 
 

1967 films
Best Theatrical Short Film Genie and Canadian Screen Award winners
National Film Board of Canada short films
1967 short films
Films directed by Fernand Dansereau
French-language Canadian films
Canadian drama short films
1960s Canadian films